Lothar Thoms (18 May 1956 – 5 November 2017) was a track cyclist from East Germany, who represented his native country at the 1980 Summer Olympics in Moscow, Russia. There he won the gold medal in the men's 1 km time trial by marking a new indoor world record. His time of 1'02"955 was more than 2 sec better than the previous record of the same year held by Urs Freuler. He also won four gold medals in the 1 km time trial (amateurs) at the 1977, 1978, 1979 and 1981 world championships respectively, thus winning all kilo events at the major international competitions in five consecutive years. In 1981 he was elected East German Sportspersonality of the year.

References

External links 
 
 
 

1956 births
2017 deaths
Sportspeople from Guben
East German male cyclists
Cyclists at the 1980 Summer Olympics
Olympic cyclists of East Germany
Olympic gold medalists for East Germany
Olympic medalists in cycling
Medalists at the 1980 Summer Olympics
East German track cyclists
People from Bezirk Cottbus
Cyclists from Brandenburg